Caribana Festival  may refer to the following festivals:
Caribana Festival (Barbuda) held in Barbuda
Caribana Festival (Canada) in the city of Toronto
Caribana Festival (Switzerland) in the village of Crans-près-Céligny